Hendrik "Henk" Albertus van der Vorst (born 5 May 1944, Venlo) is a Dutch mathematician and Emeritus Professor of Numerical Analysis at Utrecht University.  According to the Institute for Scientific Information (ISI), his paper 
on the BiCGSTAB method was the most cited paper in the field of mathematics in the 1990s.
He is a member of the Royal Netherlands Academy of Arts and Sciences (KNAW) since 2002
and the Netherlands Academy of Technology and Innovation.
In 2006 he was awarded a knighthood of the Order of the Netherlands Lion.
Henk van der Vorst is a Fellow of Society for Industrial and Applied Mathematics (SIAM).

His major contributions include preconditioned iterative methods, in particular the ICCG (incomplete
Cholesky conjugate gradient) method (developed together with Koos Meijerink), a version of preconditioned conjugate gradient method,
the BiCGSTAB and (together with Kees Vuik) GMRESR
Krylov subspace methods and (together with Gerard Sleijpen) the Jacobi-Davidson method
for solving ordinary, generalized, and nonlinear eigenproblems.
He has analyzed convergence behavior of the conjugate gradient and Lanczos methods.  He has also developed a number of preconditioners for parallel computers, including truncated Neumann series preconditioner, incomplete twisted factorizations, and the incomplete factorization based on the so-called "vdv" ordering.

He is the author of the book 
and one of the authors of the Templates projects for linear problems 
and eigenproblems.

References

External links 
Home page of Henk van der Vorst at Utrecht University (Accessed December 2009)
Private homepage of Henk van der Vorst (Accessed December 2009)

1944 births
Living people
20th-century Dutch mathematicians
21st-century Dutch mathematicians
Numerical analysts
Academic staff of Utrecht University
Academic staff of the Delft University of Technology
Utrecht University alumni
Fellows of the Society for Industrial and Applied Mathematics
Members of the Royal Netherlands Academy of Arts and Sciences
People from Venlo